The 2000 Monte Carlo Masters was a men's tennis tournament played on outdoor clay courts. It was the 94th edition of the Monte Carlo Masters, and was part of the ATP Masters Series of the 2000 ATP Tour. It took place at the Monte Carlo Country Club in Roquebrune-Cap-Martin, France, near Monte Carlo, Monaco, from 17 April through 23 April 2000.

The men's field was headlined by ATP No. 4, Australian Open runner-up, 1999 Stuttgart, Montreal titlist Yevgeny Kafelnikov, Santiago winner, Miami finalist, Monte Carlo defending champion Gustavo Kuerten and Auckland winner Magnus Norman. Other top seeds in the field were Lyon titlist Nicolás Lapentti, 1997 Monte Carlo champion Marcelo Ríos, Thomas Enqvist, Tim Henman and Cédric Pioline.

Finals

Singles

 Cédric Pioline defeated  Dominik Hrbatý, 6–4, 7–6, 7–6
It was Cédric Pioline's 2nd title of the year, and his 5th overall. It was his 1st Masters title of the year, and overall.

Doubles

 Wayne Ferreira /  Yevgeny Kafelnikov defeated  Paul Haarhuis /  Sandon Stolle, 6–3, 2–6, 6–1

References

External links
 
 ATP tournament profile
 ITF tournament edition details

 
Monte Carlo Masters
Monte-Carlo Masters
2000 in Monégasque sport
Monte